Roštín is a municipality and village in Kroměříž District in the Zlín Region of the Czech Republic. It has about 700 inhabitants.

Geography

The northwestern half of the municipality lies in the Litenčice Hills. The southeastern half lies in a forested landscape of the Chřiby range.

History
The first written mention of Roštín is from 1240. In 1250, the village was mentioned as property of the monastery in Velehrad. The settlement was probably located around the Church of Saint James the Great. After it was destroyed during the Thirty Years' War, it was restored on its current location.

Throughout the centuries, it was owned by various lower noblemen, and several times merged with neighbouring Cetechovice and then separated again.

Sights
The cemetery Church of Saint James the Great is situated in the rural area of Roštín. The original church was first mentioned in 1193, earlier than the village. It was rebuilt several times, its current form is from 1742.

The parish Church of Saint Anne was built in the centre of Roštín in 1847 to replace the remote church with its function. It was built on the site of a chapel from 1777.

There is a stone observation tower on the Brdo mountain.

Notable people
Heinrich Friedjung (1851–1920), Austrian historian and journalist

Gallery

References

External links

Villages in Kroměříž District